Di Grassi is a surname. Notable people with the surname include:

 Giacomo di Grassi (16th century), Italian fencing master
 Lucas di Grassi (born 1984), Brazilian racing driver

See also

 De Grassi (disambiguation)
 Degrassi (disambiguation)